Joseph Keith Moyer (born August 31, 1952) is an American publisher and editor of the Las Vegas Review-Journal. Moyer joined on February 5, 2016, as editor-in-chief, leaving his faculty position of six years at the University of Minnesota School of Journalism and Mass Communication. He became publisher on March 26, 2018.

Moyer was president and publisher of the Star Tribune in Minneapolis, Minnesota from 2001 to 2007. He had earlier been publisher and president for The Fresno Bee from 1997 until 2001.

Moyer joined McClatchy in 1994 as The Fresno Bees executive editor.

Moyer also held top newsroom roles at Gannett's The News-Press in Fort Myers, Florida, Democrat and Chronicle in Rochester, New York, Westchester-Rockland Newspapers in White Plains, New York and Arkansas Gazette in Little Rock, Arkansas.

In Fort Myers, Moyer served as editor of The News-Press from 1986 until 1990; during that time, he oversaw coverage of poor social conditions faced by African Americans in Southwest Florida that won the 1990 Grand Prize in the Robert F. Kennedy Journalism Awards for "Far from the Dream," a 12-part series of stories.

He is a 1977 graduate and Alumni of Distinction from the College of Journalism and Mass Communication at the University of Florida.

References

1952 births
Living people
20th-century American journalists
American male journalists
21st-century American journalists
American publishers (people)
People from Fort Myers, Florida
People from Fresno, California
People from Little Rock, Arkansas
People from Louisville, Kentucky
People from Minneapolis
People from Rochester, New York
People from the Las Vegas Valley
Satellite High School alumni
University of Florida alumni
University of Minnesota faculty